Moorella thermoacetica, previously known as Clostridium thermoaceticum, is an acetogenic, thermophilic, strictly anaerobic, endospore-forming, bacterium belonging to the phylum Bacillota.

Researchers at the Lawrence Berkeley National Laboratory, including Peidong Yang, were able to induce M. thermoacetica to photosynthesize, despite its not being photosynthetic. It also synthesized semiconductor nanoparticles, thus using light to produce chemical products other than those produced in photosynthesis.

References

External links
Type strain of Moorella thermoacetica at BacDive -  the Bacterial Diversity Metadatabase

Thermoanaerobacterales
Bacteria described in 1994
Thermophiles
Anaerobes
Acetogens